The Internal Publication of the Freedom Movement of Iran was an Iranian underground press published by the Freedom Movement of Iran that first came out on 11 June 1961. Two more issues become known at that particular time, and it was forced to cease distribution after 22 July 1961 but nonetheless was continued and revived in January 1963. The content of the series included denouncing the increasing domestic repression by the Shah's regime and its alliance with Israel.

In conjunction with the publication, three mimeographed issues of a bulletin named With and Without Interpretations was produced in early January 1962, followed up by four issues 
of another publication, namely With and Without Annotation, was published between October and December 1962. The former was mostly translation of articles on Iran published by western newspapers such as The New York Times, while the latter included news and commentary in addition to similar translations.

References 

1961 establishments in Iran
Underground press
Publications established in 1961
Publications disestablished in 1978
Defunct newspapers published in Iran
Persian-language newspapers
Publications of the Freedom Movement of Iran